The Longwood Lancers baseball team represents Longwood University, which is located in Farmville, Virginia. The Lancers are an NCAA Division I college baseball program that competes in the Big South Conference. They began competing in Division I in 2005 and joined the Big South Conference in 2013 after 8 seasons as an independent.

The Longwood Lancers play all home games on campus at Buddy Bolding Stadium. The Lancers have played in 4 Big South Tournaments, reaching the semifinals in 2016 where they would lose to eventual Big South Conference and national champion Coastal Carolina.

Since the program's inception in 1978, one Lancer have gone on to play in Major League Baseball, outfielder Michael Tucker. Ten Lancers have been drafted, including Michael Tucker who was selected tenth overall in the 1992 Major League Baseball draft.

Conference membership history (Division I only) 
2005–2012: Independent
2013–present: Big South Conference

Buddy Bolding Stadium 

Buddy Bolding Stadium is a baseball stadium on the Longwood University campus in Farmville, Virginia that seats approximately 500 people. It was opened on March 12, 1994 with an 8–3 win over Davis & Elkins (WV).

Head coaches (Division I only) 
Records taken from the 2020 Longwood Year-by-Year Results

Year-by-year NCAA Division I results
Records taken from the 2020 Longwood Year-by-Year Results

Awards and honors (Division I only)

Big South First-Team All-Conference

Taken from the 2019 Longwood Baseball Stat Records - DI Awards. Updated March 11, 2020.

Lancers in the Major Leagues

Taken from Baseball Reference. Updated March 11, 2020.

See also
List of NCAA Division I baseball programs

References